The first series of the Australian cooking game show Celebrity MasterChef Australia began production in early September 2009, and premiered on Network Ten on 30 September 2009. Matt Preston, George Calombaris and Gary Mehigan returned as judges for the show; however Sarah Wilson did not reprise her role as host from the first season of MasterChef Australia.

Former world-record holder & Olympic medalist Eamon Sullivan won the series, taking home $50,000 for charity Swim Survive Stay Alive.

Contestants
Celebrity MasterChef Australia features 18 celebrities as contestants. Network Ten officially revealed the first batch of  contestants on the 3 September 2009 episode of The 7pm Project. However, several contestants were revealed before Ten's official announcement of their participation.

The contestants include:

Ten initially announced that actor Steve Bisley would also be a participant, but he later withdrew from the show. Ten cited a scheduling conflict for his departure, though the ABC have claimed that Network Ten are using it as an excuse; the announcement of his participation on the show was the same day the actor was charged with assaulting his ex-wife Sally Burleigh during an argument between the former couple. Rachael Finch previously auditioned for the first series of MasterChef Australia, but did not make past the initial rounds.

Special guests
 Matt Moran - Heat 1 Pressure Test
 Brent Savage - Heat 2 Pressure Test
 Kylie Kwong - Heat 3 Pressure Test
 Stephanie Alexander - Heat 4 Pressure Test
 Tony Bilson - Heat 5 Pressure Test
 Katrina Kanetani - Heat 6 Pressure Test
 Steven Krasicki - Semi Final 2
 Adriano Zumbo - Semi Final 3
 Andrew McConnell - Grand Final

Episodes

References

MasterChef Australia
2009 Australian television seasons